The British Museum Act 1805 (45 Geo 3 c 127) was an Act of the Parliament of the United Kingdom.

The whole Act was repealed by section 13(5) of, and Schedule 4 to, the British Museum Act 1963.

See also
British Museum Act

References
Halsbury's Statutes,

United Kingdom Acts of Parliament 1805
1805 in London
British Museum Acts